Don Kulasiri is a professor of Computational Modelling and Systems Biology, and the founder and head of the Centre for Advanced Computational Solutions at Lincoln University, New Zealand.

Early childhood and education
Kulasiri graduated from University of Peradeniya with a Bachelor of Science in Mechanical engineering was educated at Nalanda College Colombo. Later on he went on pursuing studying Biosystems engineering gaining a Master of Science and Doctor of Philosophy degrees from Virginia Tech.

Later life

After graduation he joined University of Peradeniya as an instructor and assistant lecturer at the Department of Mechanical Engineering. Moving on he had been a Visiting Professor mathematical biology at University of Oxford in United Kingdom, Visiting Fellow at Princeton University, visiting Professor to Braunschweig University of Technology in Germany, and visiting Scholor to Stanford University.

Awards

Kulasiri had been awarded gold medals for The Best Student at Nalanda College Colombo in the late 60 and middle 70s, had won the Sigma Xi honorary membership for an outstanding PhD thesis from Virginia Tech and Fellowship from Braunschweig University of Technology.

References

Sources
 

Sinhalese academics
Alumni of Nalanda College, Colombo
Academic staff of the Lincoln University (New Zealand)
New Zealand people of Sri Lankan descent
Sri Lankan expatriate academics